The Palacio Duhau - Park Hyatt Buenos Aires is a five star establishment located in the city's Recoleta section.

Overview
The Palacio Duhau - Park Hyatt was built on an Alvear Avenue lot belonging to Alejandro Hume, a railway executive of English Argentine background. Shortly after Mayor Torcuato de Alvear widened and extended what was then known as the Camino Bella Vista during the 1880s, Hume had a Tudor Revival mansion designed by architect Carlos Ryder built in 1890. Built over a bluff, the lot behind the house remained unimproved until the City Parks Commissioner, noted urbanist Charles Thays, was hired by the family to landscape and Piveau Gratias the property, in 1913.

The property was sold to the Duhau family during the 1920s. The Duhaus - prominent landowners - commissioned architect León Dourge for the design of a new residence adjacent to the old Hume house. Inspired in the Château du Marais (in Le Val-Saint-Germain, near Paris), the resulting Neoclassical palace and its guesthouse were completed in 1932. The Duhau siblings eventually relocated to the Hume house, however, and the last of these died in 1976. The palace itself remained empty until, in 2002, local developer Juan Scalesciani purchased the property and secured a partnership with the Hyatt Hotels Group. The Chicago-based hotelier planned a Park Hyatt to replace the Retiro-area highrise sold to the Four Seasons Hotels in 2002.

Following a US$74 million investment and numerous delays over privacy concerns regarding the neighboring Vatican nunciature, the Palacio Duhau - Park Hyatt Buenos Aires was opened on July 12, 2006. The palace itself, which preserves most of its original work including its distinctive red marble flooring, houses 11 rooms and 12 of the establishment's premium suites. The new annex, constructed at the opposite, eastern end of the gardens, houses the remaining 115 rooms and 27 suites. The hotel also includes two restaurants, bar and tea rooms.

Notable guests

 Sean Penn
 Emma Watson
 Pierre Richard
 Ricky Martin
 India Mahdavi
 Will Smith
 Donald Trump
 Barack Obama
 Máxima of the Netherlands

In popular culture
 The hotel featured in the 2015 film Focus.

Notes

External links
 Buenos Aires Park Hyatt

Hotels established in 2006
Hotels in Buenos Aires
National Historic Monuments of Argentina
Palaces in Buenos Aires
Houses completed in 1932
Hyatt Hotels and Resorts